BlockDos is an Internet security company in Mississauga, Ontario that provides protection services against distributed denial of service attacks.

Background
BlockDos is a division of Server4Sale (secure hosting provider) that was founded in 2003 in Mississauga, Ontario, Canada. In 2005, Server4Sale created a new security division named BlockDos. Initially, BlockDos was a reseller of mitigation technology to other providers. Beginning in 2008, BlockDos sold its own DDoS mitigation.

The company has offices in Washington DC; Los Angeles, CA; Chicago, IL; Dallas, TX; Seattle, WA; the Netherlands; Vancouver, BC; Montreal, Quebec; London, UK; Toronto, Ontario; Russia, Ukraine, Sweden, and Malaysia.

An example of BlockDos's DDoS protection process is explained in a case study with financial services company Solid Trust Pay in early 2013. The online editor of Access Matters magazine published the study and stated, "The case study outlines the growing aggression of the attackers who set up the DDoS attacks that provoked website performance issues on Solid Trust Pay's Internet infrastructure."

Products and services
BlockDos provides protection against DDoS threats. They advertise e-mail protection, DDos mitigation, and deep packet inspection.

See also
 01 Communique

References

External links
 

Technology companies of Canada
Computer security companies
DDoS mitigation companies
Companies based in Ontario